Alexandria is browser based cross-platform library automation software used by thousands of libraries around the world, both public libraries and school libraries. These include the Houston Independent School District, Philadelphia Public Schools, and the Berkeley Unified School District.

History
COMPanion Corporation was founded in 1987 by company president Bill Schjelderup in Salt Lake City, Utah.

Version history
COMPanion Corp maintains different versions simultaneously, with the most recent and up-to-date version being Alexandria v7.15.3 with plans to release Alexandria v7.16.1 in the summer of 2016. Alexandria v7 was officially released on August 5, 2014. Alexandria v6 is still supported although active development has ceased, with the exception of maintenance updates.

Selected features
 Library management
 MARC cataloging
 Lexile integration
 Supports reading programs such as Accelerated Reader
 Due date and policy flexibility
 Thousands of flexible reports
 Z39.50 Support
 Integration with book vendors such as Bound To Stay Bound
 Web-based patron interface
 Access to third-party databases such as netTrekker

See also
 Integrated library system
 Library catalog

References

External links
 http://www.companioncorp.com
 http://www.goalexandria.com
 https://www.facebook.com/alexandrialibrarymanagement

Business software
Library automation